Format is a double-disc compilation album by English synthpop duo Pet Shop Boys. The album consists of B-sides from various singles released from 1996 to 2009 (Bilingual through Yes, or "Before" to "Did You See Me Coming?"). It is their second B-sides album after Alternative (1995), which collected B-sides from the time of their first version of "Opportunities (Let's Make Lots of Money)" (1985) through "Yesterday, When I Was Mad" (1994).

The album's release was initially announced in November 2011, then officially on 19 December 2011 through the Pet Shop Boys' official website, offering it for pre-order. The album was released on 6 February 2012 in the UK, but was released earlier in various territories worldwide, including Australia, where it was released on 3 February. The album debuted at number 26 on the UK Albums Chart, selling 5,909 copies in its first week.

Track listing

Personnel
Neil Tennant
Chris Lowe

Producers
Pet Shop Boys – all tracks
Danny Tenaglia – disc 1: track 9
David Morales – disc 2: track 2
Craig Armstrong – disc 2: track 5
Chris Zippel – disc 2: tracks 6 and 14
Stuart Crichton – disc 2: track 11
Sven Helbig – disc 2: track 13

Guest musicians
Pete Gleadall – programming on all tracks except disc 1: tracks 7 and 9; disc 2: tracks 6, 14, 16–20; additional programming and vocals on disc 2: track 18
Sylvia Mason James – additional vocals on disc 1: tracks 1 and 3
Katie Kissoon, Davide Giovannini, Joseph De Jesus, Weston Foster and Lino Rocha – additional vocals on disc 1: track 6
Peter Daou – keyboards on disc 1: track 9
Louie "Balo" Guzman and Danny Tenaglia – drum programming on disc 1: track 9
Vanessa Ichak – banji girl vocals on disc 1: track 9
Tom Stephan – additional keyboards on disc 1: track 14
Mark Bates – piano on disc 1: track 14
Jodie Linscott – percussion on disc 2: tracks 1, 3, 4 & 8
Joey Mosk – programming on disc 2: track 2
Johnny Marr – guitars on disc 2: tracks 3, 4 and 8
Craig Armstrong – orchestral arrangement on disc 2: track 5
Steve Walters – bass swoops on disc 2: track 8
Elton John – guest vocals on disc 2: track 11
Torsten Rach – orchestration on disc 2: track 13
Dave Clayton – additional keyboards and programming on disc 2: track 13
Chris Zippel – programming on disc 2: track 14

Charts

References

2012 compilation albums
Parlophone compilation albums
Pet Shop Boys compilation albums
B-side compilation albums